Mehdi Cerbah (3 April 1953 – 29 October 2021) was an Algerian footballer who played as a goalkeeper.

Career
Cerbah spent most of his career playing for Algerian sides USM Alger, JS Kabylie and RC Kouba. He played one  season of indoor football in Canada, after signing in January 1983 with NASL side Montreal Manic. He returned to Algeria and finished his career in RC Kouba until 1986.

Cerbah won 57 caps for the Algeria national team, including three appearances at the 1982 FIFA World Cup finals, which included a famous victory over West Germany. He also played in several African Cup of Nations finals, including the 1980 finals where Algeria finished runners-up, losing to Nigeria in the final 3–0.

Honours

Club
 Algerian League Champion in 1973, 1974, 1977, 1980 with JS Kabylie and in 1981 with RC Kouba
 2nd in the Algerian League in 1978, 1979 with JS Kabylie
 Algerian Cup winner in 1977 with JS Kabylie
 2nd in Algerian Cup in 1979 with JS Kabylie
 2nd in Maghreb Champions Cup with JS Kabylie
 2nd in 1983 NASL Grand Prix of Indoor Soccer with Montreal Manic

Country
 Gold medal in the 1975 Mediterranean Games in Algiers
 Gold medal in the 1978 All-Africa Games in Algiers
 Bronze medal in the 1979 Mediterranean Games in Split
 2nd in the final of the 1980 African Cup of Nations in Nigeria
 Participation in FIFA World Cup of 1982 in Spain

Individual
 Best Algerian goalkeeper of the 20th Century
 Defensive MVP of 1983 NASL Grand Prix of Indoor Soccer with Montreal Manic

References

External links
  Mehdi Cerbah statistics - dzfootball
NASL stats

1953 births
2021 deaths
Footballers from Algiers
Algerian footballers
Algerian expatriate footballers
Algeria international footballers
1982 FIFA World Cup players
1980 African Cup of Nations players
1982 African Cup of Nations players
1984 African Cup of Nations players
USM Alger players
JS Kabylie players
Montreal Manic players
RC Kouba players
North American Soccer League (1968–1984) indoor players
Expatriate soccer players in Canada
Algerian expatriate sportspeople in Canada
Mediterranean Games gold medalists for Algeria
Mediterranean Games bronze medalists for Algeria
Competitors at the 1975 Mediterranean Games
Competitors at the 1979 Mediterranean Games
African Games gold medalists for Algeria
African Games medalists in football
Association football goalkeepers
Mediterranean Games medalists in football
Competitors at the 1978 All-Africa Games
21st-century Algerian people